Doctors Hospital and Medical Center is a 250-bedded private hospital located in Lahore, Punjab, Pakistan. It is attached to Lahore Medical and Dental College as a teaching hospital.

In 1996, a small group of Pakistani doctors practicing in the United States held a retreat in Pennsylvania to discuss the creation of a new medical facility in Pakistan. These doctors moved back to Pakistan and started to build the Doctors' Hospital and Medical Center. Many colleagues of different specialties joined the core group and the hospital was established in 2000.

Departments 
Doctors Hospital and Medical Center has following departments.

 Cancer Center
 Cardiac Surgery
 Cardiology
 Clinical Nutrition
 Dermatology
 Diabetes and Endocrinology
 Emergency Care
 Ear, Nose and Throat
 Gastroenterology
 General Surgery
 Hematology and Oncology
 Hepato – Pancreatico – Billary and Liver Transplant Surgery
 Internal Medicine
 Kidney Transplant
 Microbiology
 Nephrology and Dialysis
 Neurology
 Nuclear Medicine
 Obstetrics and Gynecology
 Ophthalmology
 Oral and Maxillofacial Surgery
 Orthopaedic Surgery
 Pathology
 Pediatric Oncology
 Pediatrics
 Physical Therapy
 Plastic Surgery
 Psychiatry
 Pulmonology
 Radiology
 Speech Therapist
 Surgical Oncology
 Urology
 Vascular Surgery

References

External links
 

Hospitals in Lahore
Teaching hospitals in Pakistan